Ahmadabad-e Mosaddeq, also known as Aḩmadābād-e Kāshānī and Aḩmadābād) is a village in Ahmadabad Rural District of the Central District of Nazarabad County, Alborz province, Iran, 7.5 km southwest of Abyek.  Mohammad Mosaddegh, former Prime Minister of Iran, is buried in Ahmadabad-e Mosaddeq. At the 2006 census, its population was 1,401 in 358 households. At the latest census in 2016, the population was 1,603 in 507 households; it is the largest village in its rural district.

The Iranian politician Mohammad Mosaddegh spent his days of exile in his estates and is buried under his dining room. The compound has been subjected to serious deterioration, due to newly-imposed government restrictions.

There was previously a high school named after Mossadegh, called Mossadegh High School, by popular vote during the period of the overthrow of the Shah in the 1970s. However, it was renamed following the denunciations against Mossadegh made by Ayatollah Khomeini. The place now stands as Emam Khomeini High School.

References 

Nazarabad County
Populated places in Alborz Province
Populated places in Nazarabad County
Mohammad Mosaddegh